Bektež is a village in Požega-Slavonia County, Croatia. The village is administered as a part of the city of Kutjevo.
According to national census of 2001, population of the village is 430. The village is connected by the D51 state road.

Sources 

Populated places in Požega-Slavonia County